Abdullah Badri is a Libyan former cyclist. He competed in the road race at the 1988 Summer Olympics.

References

Year of birth missing (living people)
Living people
Libyan male cyclists
Olympic cyclists of Libya
Cyclists at the 1988 Summer Olympics
Place of birth missing (living people)